The Costanera Center is a commercial and business complex located in the commune of Providencia, Santiago, Chile. Owned by Cencosud, the complex consists of four skyscrapers, including the Gran Torre Santiago, two high-end hotels, an office building, and a six-floor shopping mall.

It is the second tallest building in Latin America, following Torres Obispado, and the third tallest in the Southern Hemisphere, after Indonesia's Autograph Tower in Jakarta and Australia's Q1 on the Gold Coast.

Construction of the Costanera Center was temporarily halted in January 2009 due to the late 2000s recession. The developers were concerned that they would not be able to find tenants if completed by the originally proposed date. After the recession ended, Cencosud announced that construction would resume on December 16, 2009. The construction process restarted at the end of 2010.

On February 14, 2012, the Gran Torre Santiago reached 300 meters and became the tallest building in South and Latin America. The mall in the complex, designed by Canadian retail agency Watt International, opened on June 12, 2012, and is the largest in South America. It comprises six floors and includes the Jumbo hypermarket.

Gallery

References

External links

Costanera Center WebSite

César Pelli buildings
Buildings and structures in Santiago
Buildings and structures under construction in Chile
Tourist attractions in Santiago, Chile